Erika Moen (born 1983) is an American comic book artist, known for her autobiographical comic DAR, and the educational/erotic comic Oh Joy, Sex Toy.

Biography
Moen was born in 1983 and based in Portland, Oregon. She graduated from Pitzer College with a BA in Illustrated Storytelling in 2006. She identifies as queer. She and her husband, fellow artist Matthew Nolan, have been married since October 2008.

Moen is the creator of the self-published autobiographical online comic DAR! which has been collected into self-published print volumes. She also has contributed comic work to Best Erotic Comics 2008 (Last Gasp), True Porn Volume 2 (Alternative Comics), Flight Volume 1; and Unsafe for All Ages, a collection of erotic short stories by gay and lesbian artists published by Prism Comics in 2005. In 2004, Moen was profiled as a promising new talent "taking over the comic world with her stories about queer culture, sex, humor and cute girls" by Sequential Tart.

In 2011, she began collaborating with Marvel Comics writer Jeff Parker on Bucko, a murder mystery/farce webcomic set in Portland. The story concluded in 2012, and was published in a collected volume by Dark Horse Comics.

Moen is a member of Periscope Studio. She was among the comic book artists featured at the 6th annual Stumptown Comics Art Show in April and May 2010 at the Portland Center for the Performing Arts.

Since April 2013, Moen has been working full-time on her current webcomics project Oh Joy, Sex Toy, which centers around "reviews of everything that relates to sex, sexuality and the sex industry". The series, which updates with a new review every Tuesday, has garnered a great deal of positive attention, including a reference in Dan Savage's advice column Savage Love. Strips have also been syndicated on several websites including Bitch Media and Fleshbot.

In addition to her comic work, Erika worked as Production Assistant in the Storyboard Department on Henry Selick's 3D Stop Motion Film Coraline.

Notes

References

Further reading

External links

Oh Joy, Sex Toy
Erika Moen at Periscope Studio
Erika Moen at Prism Comics

American women cartoonists
American comics writers
American webcomic creators
American female comics artists
Female comics writers
Living people
Artists from Portland, Oregon
Queer artists
Queer women
1983 births
Queer writers
LGBT comics creators
American cartoonists
21st-century American women